The 2011 Pacific League Climax Series (PLCS) consisted of two consecutive series, Stage 1 being a best-of-three series and Stage 2 being a best-of-six with the top seed being awarded a one-win advantage. The winner of the series advanced to the 2011 Japan Series, where they competed against the 2011 Central League Climax Series winner. The top three regular-season finishers played in the two series. The PLCS began with the first game of Stage 1 on October 29 and ended with the final game of Stage 2 on November 5.

First stage

Summary

Game 1

Game 2

Final stage

Summary

* The Pacific League regular season champion is given a one-game advantage in the Final Stage.

Game 1

Game 2

Game 3

Having won the previous two games and along with the one-game advantage, the Hawks needed a win or a tie to advance to the Japan Series. After the Lions' did not score in the top half of the 12th inning, the Hawks secured a tie game, which ensured that they would advance, however the bottom half of the inning was played anyway. When this situation occurred again in the First Stage of the 2014 Central League Climax Series, the decision was made to not play the bottom half of the last inning.

References

Climax Series
Pacific League Climax Series